The Outstanding Achievement Medal is a single grade decoration of the Philippines awarded by the Secretary of National Defense.

Criteria
The medal is awarded by the Secretary of National Defense to personnel of the Armed Forces of the Philippines as well as Philippine civilians.  Civilians and military personnel of allied foreign countries may also be awarded the medal.  The medal is presented "...for distinguished or extraordinary achievement or service in the advancement of science or in socio-economic, technical or military fields related to national defense, or for public service of the highest order."

Description
The design of the medal is a gold star surrounded by a gold wreath.  These symbols represent outstanding achievement and honor, respectively. The medal is suspended from a ribbon worn around the neck.

The ribbon is purple with a central gold stripe.

See also
 Awards and decorations of the Armed Forces of the Philippines

References

Bibliography
 The AFP Adjutant General, AFP Awards and Decorations Handbook, 1995, 1997, OTAG.

Military awards and decorations of the Philippines
Orders, decorations, and medals of the Philippines